Arlando Teller is an American politician and a former Democratic member of the Arizona House of Representatives representing District 7 from January 14, 2019, until his resignation on February 1, 2021. Teller was elected in 2018 to succeed retiring State Representative Wenona Benally. Teller is a member of the Navajo Nation.

Teller resigned from the legislature after accepting a position with the United States Department of Transportation as deputy assistant secretary for tribal affairs.

Teller graduated from Embry-Riddle Aeronautical University in 1995, and eventually became deputy director of the Navajo Department of Transportation, prior to running for public office.

References

Year of birth missing (living people)
Living people
Democratic Party members of the Arizona House of Representatives
21st-century American politicians
LGBT state legislators in Arizona
Native American state legislators in Arizona
Gay politicians
LGBT Native Americans
21st-century American LGBT people